Peter R. Romero (February 18, 1920 – July 29, 2010) was an art director. He was nominated for an Academy Award in the category Best Art Direction for the film The Right Stuff.

Selected filmography
 The Right Stuff (1983)

References

External links

1920 births
2010 deaths
American art directors